It's Timeless is a live album by the Timeless All Stars featuring trombonist Curtis Fuller, saxophonist Harold Land, vibraphonist Bobby Hutcherson, and pianist Cedar Walton that was recorded at Keystone Korner in 1982 and released by the Dutch Timeless label.

Reception

Allmusic reviewer Michael G. Nastos stated: "Live from the Keystone Korner in San Francisco. Definitive group jazz of the '80s".

Track listing 
 Introduction – 1:20
 "Clockwise" (Cedar Walton) – 10:28
 "Stella by Starlight" (Victor Young, Ned Washington) – 10:18
 "Lover Man" (Jimmy Davis, Ram Ramirez, James Sherman) – 5:18
 "My Foolish Heart" (Young, Washington) – 9:37
 "Highway One" (Bobby Hutcherson) – 7:57
 "Arabia" (Curtis Fuller) – 8:35

Personnel 
Curtis Fuller – trombone
Harold Land – tenor saxophone
Bobby Hutcherson – vibraphone
Cedar Walton – piano 
Buster Williams – bass
Billy Higgins – drums

References 

1982 live albums
Cedar Walton live albums
Curtis Fuller live albums
Harold Land live albums
Bobby Hutcherson live albums
Buster Williams live albums
Billy Higgins live albums
Timeless Records live albums